Error is the debut studio album by South Korean singer Lee Chan-hyuk, a member of sibling duo AKMU. It was released on October 17, 2022, through YG Entertainment. The album consists of eleven tracks, including the lead single "Panorama", and centered on the theme of death.

Background 
On October 6, 2022, YG Entertainment announced that Lee would release his first album as a soloist, titled Error, on October 17.

Track listing

Charts

Release history

References 

2022 debut albums
Korean-language albums
YG Entertainment albums